Kaarlo Anton "Kalle" Koskelo (12 April 1888 – 21 December 1953) was a Greco-Roman wrestler from Finland who won the featherweight event at the 1912 Olympics. He then fought in World War I and Finnish Civil War, and in 1919 immigrated to the United States. He settled in Astoria, Oregon, where he became a prominent local businessman.

Family
Kaarlo  Koskelo married Lydia Koskelo (née Husa, 1889–1973) in 1909. Their son Elmer Koskelo (1912–1997) was a star javelin thrower at the University of Oregon.

References

External links

profile

https://landmarkhunter.com/207812-union-steam-baths/

1888 births
1953 deaths
People from Kotka
People from Viipuri Province (Grand Duchy of Finland)
Wrestlers at the 1912 Summer Olympics
Finnish male sport wrestlers
Olympic wrestlers of Finland
Olympic gold medalists for Finland
American people of Finnish descent
Olympic medalists in wrestling
Medalists at the 1912 Summer Olympics
People of the Finnish Civil War (Red side)
Sportspeople from Kymenlaakso